The 1988 World Juniors Track Cycling Championships were the 14th annual Junior World Championships for track cycling held in Odense, Denmark in August 1988.

The Championships had five events for men (Sprint, Points race, Individual pursuit, Team pursuit and 1 kilometre time trial) and two for women (Individual pursuit and Sprint).

Events

Medal table

References

UCI Juniors Track World Championships
1988 in track cycling
1988 in Danish sport